Ronald "Ronnie" Dean Coleman (born May 13, 1964) is an American retired professional bodybuilder. The winner of the Mr. Olympia title for eight consecutive years, he is widely regarded as either the greatest bodybuilder of all time or one of the two greatest along with Arnold Schwarzenegger and as the most dominant bodybuilding physique ever to grace the stage. Winner of 26 IFBB professional titles, he is also renowned for his combination of size and conditioning, dominant body-parts and extremely heavy workouts, making him the strongest bodybuilder of all time.

Early life
Ronnie Dean Coleman was born in Monroe, Louisiana, on May 13, 1964. He graduated cum laude from Grambling State University in 1984 with a BSc in accounting. While there, he played football as a middle linebacker with the GSU Tigers under coach Eddie Robinson. After graduation, he failed to find work as an accountant and instead went to work at Domino's Pizza, where he would eat the complimentary pizza every day due to being so poor that he could barely afford to eat outside of work. He then became a police officer in Arlington, Texas, serving as an officer from 1989 to 2000 and a reserve officer until 2003.

Bodybuilding career 

Coleman's fellow officer Gustavo Arlotta suggested he attend the Metroflex gym, owned by amateur bodybuilder Brian Dobson. Dobson offered Coleman a free lifetime membership if he allowed Dobson to train him for the upcoming 1990 Mr. Texas bodybuilding competition. After training for Mr. Texas, Coleman won first place in both the heavyweight and overall categories. He also defeated Dobson himself. Coleman won his first competition as a professional, the Canada Pro Cup, in 1995. The following year, he won the contest again, then went on to win the 1997 Russian Grand Prix. He also participated in powerlifting competitions in the mid-1990s.

His rise at the top in the professional circuit of bodybuilding was relatively slow: for his first participation at the Mr. Olympia contest (the most prestigious worldwide) in 1992, he wasn't ranked; then in 1994 he placed 15th, then 10th in 1995, 6th in 1996, and 9th in 1997 when Dorian Yates won his sixth and last title before retiring. The following year, Kenneth Wheeler was favored to become the 10th individual Mr. Olympia titleholder, with predominant competition coming from Nasser El Sonbaty, Kevin Levrone, and Shawn Ray. However, Coleman—whose Night of Champions victory earlier in the year had considerably elevated his esteem in the bodybuilding world—brought substantial improvements to the stage and went on to defeat Wheeler by three points for his first Mr. Olympia win. Coleman defended his title all the way through the 2005 contest, earning a total of eight consecutive victories and tying Lee Haney as the most successful Mr. Olympia in history. In 2001, he became the first man to win both the Arnold Classic and the Mr. Olympia titles the same year (only Dexter Jackson has repeated this feat, in 2008). Coleman's reign as Mr. Olympia came to an end in 2006 when Jay Cutler, the three-time consecutive runner-up heading into the contest, finally earned his first win. It was only the second time in contest history that a reigning multi-champion Mr. Olympia had lost his title (as opposed to retiring). The previous instance occurred when Arnold Schwarzenegger defeated Sergio Oliva in 1970. Coleman made his final Mr. Olympia appearance in 2007, placing 4th.

Coleman's success as a professional bodybuilder has led to many product endorsements and other opportunities in his career, which he has traveled the world to promote. He has made many guest appearances at gym openings around the U.S. When training, he preferred to use free weights rather than machines in order to maximize his flexibility and range of motion. He has made three training videos: The Unbelievable, The Cost of Redemption, and On the Road. In these videos, he gives tips for more experienced weightlifters, while warning against overexertion and improper form.

Coleman supports the Inner City Games, an organization co-founded by Arnold Schwarzenegger in 1991. He was the recipient of the 2001 Admiral in the Texas Navy Certificate Award from Texas Governor Rick Perry for outstanding achievements in bodybuilding and for the promotion of physical fitness. In 2011, he launched Ronnie Coleman Signature Series, a company that provides sports nutrition and wellness products for bodybuilders and other athletes.

The extreme weights Coleman used over the course of his career competing as a powerlifter and bodybuilder, such as squats and deadlifts with 800 lbs, took a toll on his body and he has undergone numerous surgeries since 2007. These include two hip replacements and various attempts at alleviating chronic pain from damaged intervertebral discs. He has continued to train despite his deteriorated condition, but can only use light weights now, to try to prevent muscle loss as of 2018, and some of his surgeries (each one costing between $300,000 and $500,000) had such poor outcomes that he may never be able to walk unassisted again. Coleman uses a wheelchair if he has to travel long distances. However, he has said that he does not regret his choices and admits that he was determined to be the best bodybuilder at any cost; he said that, if anything, he regrets not having done even more to consolidate his legacy.

In 2018, Vlad Yudin documented Coleman's life and career in the Netflix documentary Ronnie Coleman: The King. For the film's credits, rapper Quan made a song called "Flexin' on Them (Ronnie Coleman)" inspired by Coleman's bodybuilding career.

In popular culture
With his trademark high-pitched voice, some of the vocal gimmicks Coleman popularized in his training videos have become commonplace in the global bodybuilding community, especially after the advent of viral videos. The most popular of these, which he regularly shouted to himself as a form of self-encouragement, include "Yeah buddy!", "Light weight, baby!", and "Ain't nothin' but a peanut!"

Personal life
Coleman is a devout Christian. He met French-Lebanese personal trainer Rouaida Christine Achkar at a sports exposition in Paris in March 1998, and they were married in Beirut on December 28, 2007. They divorced soon after. Coleman married American personal trainer Susan Williamson on April 11, 2016. They reside in Arlington, Texas, and have four children together.

In June 2020, Coleman revealed that he can no longer walk unassisted due to botched surgical procedures. Saying that he may never walk again, Coleman blamed his problems on questionable surgeries and noted that his last 3 surgeries cost a total of $2 million.

Physical statistics 
Height: 
Contest weight: 
Off-season weight: 
Chest / Back:  
Arms: 
Legs:

Famous lifts 
Deadlift:  –  x 2 reps (The Unbelievable, 2000)
Squat:  –  x 2 reps (The Cost of Redemption, 2003)
Bench press:  –  x 5 reps (The Cost of Redemption, 2003)
Dumbbell Bench press:  –  Dumbbells x 12 reps (The Unbelievable, 2000)
Military press:  –  x 12 reps (The Unbelievable, 2000)
Dumbbell Shoulder press:  –  Dumbbells x 7 reps (The Cost of Redemption, 2003)
Bent-over row:  –  x 10 reps (Relentless, 2006)
T-bar (corner) row:  –  x 9 reps (The Unbelievable, 2000) &  x 12 reps (Relentless, 2006)
Front Squat:  –  x 4 reps (The Unbelievable, 2000)
Hack Squat:  –  x 8 reps (The Unbelievable, 2000)
Lunges:  –  x 20 reps per leg (The Unbelievable, 2000)
Barbell Shrugs:  –  x 11 reps (The Cost of Redemption, 2003)
Dumbbell Shrugs:  –  Dumbbells x 15 reps (Relentless, 2006)
Calf raises:  –  x 20 reps (Relentless, 2006)
Leg press:  –  x 8 reps (The Cost of Redemption, 2003)

Filmography

Bodybuilding titles

See also 

 List of male professional bodybuilders

References

External links

Ronnie Coleman Nutrition
MuscleSport Mag article on comeback during radio interview
Ronnie Coleman's supplement brand 'Ronnie Cole Signature Series'

1964 births
Living people
African-American bodybuilders
African-American Christians
African-American police officers
American police officers
African-American players of American football
Grambling State Tigers football players
People from Bastrop, Louisiana
Players of American football from Louisiana
Professional bodybuilders
Articles containing video clips
21st-century African-American people
20th-century African-American sportspeople